is a 52-episode anime series directed by Fumio Kurokawa and produced by Nippon Animation which was first aired in 1975. The story is based on the children's story "Sinbad the Sailor".

Synopsis 
Sinbad is a young boy and the son of a famous merchant from Baghdad. Sinbad especially enjoys listening to the adventure stories of his uncle Ali who has brought Sinbad a strange speaking bird named Shera with him from his journeys. Sinbad joins his uncle, in hope of being a part of his uncle's next adventure. After a giant whale attacks the boat, Sinbad ends up on a deserted island. Separated from his uncle, Sinbad begins the adventure alone with only Shera for company. When he returns home from his first adventures, he finds to his shock that his parents are missing, since they have gone to find him and were apparently lost at sea. With no formal ties left at home in Baghdad, Sinbad sets out again in search for adventure.

Throughout the series, Sinbad journeys to different destinations together with Shera and his friends - Ali Baba and Aladdin. They encounter a number of strange creatures, including a giant bird, gigantic snakes, mermaids, genies, Lilliputians, and hostile magicians. He also meets several other characters and enacts stories featured in Arabian Nights, including the Forty Thieves, the stories of The Genie and the Merchant, or the Flying Horse. In the end, after Sinbad has vanquished the evil magicians coming after his life, all whom he loves rejoin him, including his lost parents and his uncle, who have been captured by a malevolent supreme sorceress.

Cast of characters

Protagonists

The main character of the series, Sinbad is portrayed as the young and only son of a merchant and his wife who, inspired by his sea-faring uncle Ali, yearns for adventure. Despite his young age, he is extraordinarily clever and resourceful and manages to make his way through any obstacle he encounters.

An intelligent, talking bird (a slightly oversized myna) who initially belonged to Sinbad's uncle Ali before he bequeathed her to his nephew. As it is revealed later, Shera is actually a human princess transformed by a malevolent sorcerer, cursed to remain permanently in that form if she willingly tells anyone of her plight. In the course of the series, Sinbad finds out about her condition and eventually helps her and her parents regain their human forms.

A young boy from a poor family and Sinbad's best friend despite his low status. He supports his family (of which his three younger brothers are most prominently shown) as a water seller's assistant in the streets of Baghdad.

A young, adventurous desert raider and a former member of a robber gang. He was born in Baghdad, but abducted by a slaver as a child and rescued by the bandits who adopted him. After meeting and befriending Sinbad, he has a change of heart and accompanies the boy on his adventures.

An old man who once possessed a Genie lamp which fulfilled all his wishes, but lost it many years ago and subsequently fell on hard times. While working as a ferryman on the Nile, a river genie stole his boat; but after Sinbad tricks the genie into submission, Aladdin accompanies Sinbad on his adventures, serving him with a lifetime's worth of accumulated wisdom.

A mermaid who is caught by Sinbad while he is helping a poor fisherman. When he releases her unconditionally, she befriends him and continues to help him on several occasions whenever his adventures lead to the sea.

Sinbad's sea-faring uncle and Shera's original owner, whose tales of faraway lands inspire Sinbad to go adventuring.

Sinbad's father is a wealthy and renowned merchant in Bagdad, who is stern but well-meaning with his son. His voice actor, Ichiro Nagai, also provides the series' narration.

A female servant of Sindbad's household.

The King's young daughter, who is always eager to hear about Sinbad's adventures.

The ruler of Bagdad and Princess Sharam's father. In the first episode his name is revealed to be Harun al-Rashid.
Shera's Parents
The rulers of an unknown realm who were transformed into white eagles by Tabasa's son Satajit, but like their daughter have retained their human personalities.

A pre-adolescent desert giant. Jian first meets Sinbad's group when Ali Baba runs into him and out of fear buries his dagger in Jian's foot. After Sinbad and his friends remove the blade, Jian befriends them and later saves them from being eaten by his father.

A roc chick which hatched from an egg a ship captain collected from a lonely island. When it hatches aboard the ship, Sinbad feeds and befriends it; in turn, Rockle later saves him from hostile natives and later helps him in his fight against the Blue Demon King's minions.

Antagonists

An old evil witch whose greatest weakness is her tremendrous fear of mice. She and her sons Satajit and Balba comprise Sinbad's main nemeses for most of the series.

The younger son of Tabasa, who shares his penchant for evil magic with her and his brother Satajit. He performs the role of the evil sorcerer from the tale "The Ebony Horse".

The elder son of Tabasa, and like her and his brother Balba an evil sorcerer by trade. Satajit is responsible for transforming Shera and her parents after the latter had him imprisoned for his crimes in their realm. In the series, he first appears personifying the magician from the tale "Aladdin".

An evil sorceress who looks outwardly like a beautiful, blue-skinned young woman, but actually has the head and forehooves of a cow, though her true form is always revealed by her shadow. She is based on the evil sorceress from the tale "The Ensorcelled Prince" from "The Fisherman and the Jinni".

A powerful, blue-skinned fiend who is the patron of all evil magicians and genies in the series.

Episode list

Music

Alternative titles
 アラビアンナイト シンドバットの冒険 (Japanese title)
 Los viajes de Simbad (Spanish title)
 Przygody Sindbada (Polish title)
 Shirab, il ragazzo di Bagdad (Italian title)
 Sinbad de Zeeman (Dutch title)
 Sinbad die Seeman (Afrikaans title)
 Sinbad le marin (French title)
 아라비안 나이트 신밧드의 모험 (South Korean title)
 Sindbad (German title)
 The Arabian Nights: Adventures of Sinbad (English title)
 مغامرات سندباد (Arabic title)
 ماجراهای سندباد (Persian title)
 Sinbad (Turkish title)
 Sindbad Jahazi (Indian title)
 Σεβάχ ο θαλασσινός (Greek title)
 Sindbad marinarul (Romanian title)

See also 
 One Thousand and One Nights

References

External links
 
 アラビアンナイト　シンドバットの冒険 Official Nippon Animation Homepage 
 Sindbad the Sailor English Version Homepage at Nipponanimation.com
 Sindbad Catoon Arabic / English Website - Story, Characters, Downloads,DVD And Much More.. 
 - موقع مغامرات سندباد - القصة, ملخص الحلقات, الشخصيات, الـ دى في دى, والمزيد
 Anime Online
 

Anime and manga based on fairy tales
1975 anime television series debuts
1976 Japanese television series endings
Nippon Animation
Works based on Sinbad the Sailor
Television shows based on children's books
Fuji TV original programming
Roc (mythology)
Fictional sailors
Adventure anime and manga
Historical anime and manga
Fantasy anime and manga